The 2001 IIHF World Championship was held between 28 April and 13 May 2001 in Nuremberg, Cologne and Hanover, Germany.

It was the 65th annual event, and was run by the International Ice Hockey Federation (IIHF).

Venues

Qualification Tournament

Far Eastern Qualification for the tournament took place between September 4 and September 6, 2000 in Sapporo, Japan.

All times local

Final tournament

In the first round, the top 3 teams from each group progressed to the second round, whilst the last placed team progressed to the consolation round.

First round

Group A

All times local

Group B

All times local

Group C

All times local

Group D

All times local

Second round

In the Second Round, the top 4 teams from each group progressed to the Final Round, whilst the bottom 2 teams are eliminated.

Group E

Tables and scores below include meetings between teams during the First Round.

Group F

Tables and scores below include meetings between teams during the First Round.

Consolation round 13–16 Place

Group G

As the Far Eastern qualifier,  avoids relegation.

All times local

Final round

Quarterfinals

Semifinals

Match for third place

Final

Ranking and statistics

Tournament Awards
Best players selected by the directorate:
Best Goaltender:       Milan Hnilička
Best Defenceman:       Kim Johnsson
Best Forward:          Sami Kapanen
Most Valuable Player:  David Moravec
Media All-Star Team:
Goaltender:  Milan Hnilička
Defence:  Kim Johnsson,  Petteri Nummelin
Forwards:  Sami Kapanen,  Robert Reichel,  Martin Ručinský

Final standings
According to the IIHF:
The final standings of the tournament according to IIHF:

Scoring leaders

List shows the top skaters sorted by points, then goals. If the list exceeds 10 skaters because of a tie in points, all of the tied skaters are left out.

Leading goaltenders
Only the top five goaltenders, based on save percentage, who have played 40% of their team's minutes are included in this list.

See also
IIHF World Championship

References

 
IIHF World Championship
1
World championships
World
International ice hockey competitions hosted by Germany
April 2001 sports events in Europe
May 2001 sports events in Europe
Sports competitions in Cologne
2000s in Cologne
2000s in Lower Saxony
2000s in North Rhine-Westphalia
2001 in Bavaria
21st century in Hanover
Sports competitions in Nuremberg
Sports competitions in Hanover
21st century in Nuremberg